Pragnya Ayyagari (Telugu: ప్రజ్ఞ అయ్యగారి); (born February 10, 2002) is an Indian model and beauty pageant titleholder who was crowned Miss Supranational India on 28 August 2022 in Mumbai by outgoing Miss Supranational India and Miss Supranational Asia 2022 Ritika Khatnani. Pragnya will now represent India at Miss Supranational 2023 competition to be held in mid-2023 in Poland.

Pageantry 
Pragnya won the Femina Miss India Telangana 2022 title in May and represented Telangana at the Femina Miss India 2022 pageant on 3 June 2022, finishing among the Top 5 finalists. Later, in early August, she was chosen from a pool of contestants to represent India at the Miss Supranational pageant the following year. Pragnya was crowned Miss Diva Supranational 2023 on August 28, 2022, by her predecessor Ritika Khatnani, Miss Supranational Asia 2022.

Miss Supranational 2023 
Pragnya will represent India at the Miss Supranational 2023 pageant, which will take place in Poland by mid-2023.

References

External links

Indian beauty pageant winners
Living people
1999 births